Sudden Strike 3: Arms for Victory or Sudden Strike III is a real-time tactics computer games by Russian studio Fireglow Games set in World War II, the third game in the Sudden Strike series and the sequel to Sudden Strike 2.

Gameplay
Sudden Strike 3 was unique in the series in that it was the first released game in the franchise featuring 3D graphics. It was released in April 2008, and it currently has a free add-on for it. It features the pacific campaigns, as well as the U.S. and Allied campaigns as well as Germany. It also features a better map editor, with more features such as making trenches.

Engine improvements
The revamped engine allowed for improved damage characteristics, balance of forces, and winter battles. Certain abilities we're brought back from earlier games in Sudden Strike: The Last Stand such as ambushes in houses, landing parties, reconnaissance, transportation of infantry on tanks and many other things.

Sudden Strike 3: Arms for Victory - Ardennes Offensive
The first addon to the original Sudden Strike 3 covered the Battle of the Bulge and was released in 2008. France was included as a new faction as were new multiplayer maps.

Sudden Strike: The Last Stand
An enhanced version of Sudden Strike 3 which was released in 2009. The game features improved graphics and tactical user interface experience.

Sudden Strike Iwo Jima
A standalone campaign featuring the Japanese during the Battle of Iwo Jima as part of Pacific War.

Sudden Strike Normandy
A standalone campaign featuring the Allies during the Normandy landings as part of Operation Overlord.

Reception 
GameSpot rated Sudden Strike 3 as the best of the franchise. Sudden Strike 3: Arms for Victory holds a 63 Metascore based on 10 critic ratings.

See also 
 Sudden Strike

References

2007 video games
Real-time tactics video games
Real-time strategy video games
Video games developed in Russia
Windows games
Windows-only games
CDV Software Entertainment games
Multiplayer and single-player video games